Benjamin Declercq (born 4 February 1994 in Kortrijk) is a Belgian former cyclist, who competed as a professional from 2017 to 2022. He is the brother of Tim Declercq, a professional cyclist on the  team.

Major results

2014
 4th Paris–Tours Espoirs
 10th Circuit de Wallonie
2016
 2nd Eschborn-Frankfurt City Loop U23
 7th Grand Prix Criquielion
2017
 9th Dwars door het Hageland
2018
 3rd Grand Prix Pino Cerami
 7th Famenne Ardenne Classic
2019
 2nd Grand Prix Pino Cerami
 6th Druivenkoers Overijse
 10th Schaal Sels
2020
 6th Dwars door het Hageland
 7th Overall Tour du Limousin
2022
 9th Overall Saudi Tour

References

External links

1994 births
Living people
Belgian male cyclists
Sportspeople from Kortrijk
Cyclists from West Flanders
21st-century Belgian people